Here's Loretta Lynn is a compilation album by American country music singer-songwriter Loretta Lynn. It was released on April 22, 1968, by Vocalion Records.

Background
The album features recordings Lynn made for Zero Records in 1960, prior to signing with Decca Records. The only songs Lynn recorded for Zero Records that are not included on this album are her debut single,"I'm a Honky Tonk Girl", and "Darlin' Don't", which remains unreleased.

Lynn would later re-record "The Darkest Day" for inclusion on 1966's You Ain't Woman Enough. She would re-record it once again, along with "My Angel Mother", for 2018's Wouldn't It Be Great. "My Life Story" was retitled "Story of My Life" and re-recorded with updated lyrics for 2004's Van Lear Rose.

Critical reception

The review in the May 4, 1968 issue of Billboard magazine said the album is "A must have for all Loretta Lynn fans—a collection of her early material before she actually joined Decca Records. It's amazing how good she was, even then! You'll enjoy "The Darkest Day" and "Blue Steel"."

Cashbox also published a review in their May 4 issue which said, "Originally waxed for the Canadian-based Zero label, this LP contains the only early Loretta Lynn cuts that were not recorded for Decca. Decca has bought the cuts and now owns and has released everything Loretta has recorded. Fans who have all of Loretta's other Decca recordings can make their collection complete by buying this set, which Decca has issued on its economy-priced Vocalion label. All the songs are Loretta's own compositions, and she sings them in fine style."

In a review for AllMusic, Eugene Chadbourne said of the album, "The songs are really very good, rich with detail and, needless to say, convincing in emotion."

Commercial performance
The album did not appear on any music charts.

The first single, "Heartaches Meet Mr. Blues", was released in August 1960 and did not chart. The second single, "The Darkest Day", was released in May 1961 and also did not chart.

Track listing

Personnel
Adapted from the album liner notes and recording session records.
Muddy Berry – drums
Hal Buksbaum – photography
Don Grashey - producer
Harold Hensley – fiddle
Roy Lanham – guitar
Loretta Lynn – lead vocals
Speedy West – steel
Al Williams – bass

References

1968 compilation albums
Loretta Lynn compilation albums